The Zytek 07S is a sports prototype race car, designed, developed and built by British manufacturer Zytek, to compete in the LMP1 class in sports car racing, in 2007. It is the successor of the Zytek 04S. The chassis evolved in 2009 and took the name Ginetta-Zytek GZ09S following the merger between Ginetta and Zytek who have a common shareholder in the person of Lawrence Tomlinson.

Race history

Le Mans Series 2007
Victory in the LMP2 category at the 1,000 kilometers of Silverstone with Barazi-Epsilon
Victory in the LMP2 category at the Mil Milhas Brasil with Barazi-Epsilon

Le Mans Series 2009
Champion in the LMP2 category with the Quifel ASM Team
Victory in the LMP2 category at the Algarve 1,000 kilometers with the Quifel ASM Team
Victory in the LMP2 category at the 1,000 kilometers of the Nürburgring with the Quifel ASM Team

Le Mans Series 2010
Victory in the LMP2 category at the 1,000 kilometers of Spa with the Quifel ASM Team
2nd in the Hungaroring 1,000 kilometers with the Quifel ASM Team
Victory in the LMP1 category at the Hungaroring 1,000 kilometers with Beechdean Mansell Motorsport

Le Mans Series 2011
Champion in the LMP2 category with Greaves Motorsport
3rd and victory in the LMP2 category at the 6 Hours of Le Castellet with Greaves Motorsport
Victory in the LMP2 category at the 6 Hours of Imola with Greaves Motorsport
Victory in the LMP2 category at the 6 Hours of Silverstone with Greaves Motorsport

24 hours of Le Mans
Victory in the LMP2 category at the 2011 24 Hours of Le Mans with Greaves Motorsport

References

External links

Le Mans Prototypes
24 Hours of Le Mans race cars
Sports prototypes
Zytek Engineering vehicles